Ni Weidou (born October 6, 1932, in Zhenhai, Ningbo, Zhejiang) is a Chinese mechanical and thermodynamical scientist and engineer.

Career
Ni's hometown is Zhenhai District, Ningbo, Zhejiang province. Ni entered Tsinghua University in 1951. Ni was transferred to the Bauman Moscow State Technical University of USSR and graduated in 1957. Ni obtained Candidate of Sciences degree (in 1962) and later honorary doctor degree (in 1990) from the Saint Petersburg Polytechnical University.

Ni is a professor at energy department of Tsinghua University. Ni was former Executive Vice-president of Tsinghua University.

Ni is a senior academician of the Chinese Academy of Engineering. Ni is the Vice-chairman of the Beijing Association for Science and Technology. Ni is also a leader and senior advisor of energy strategy,  technology, policy for Chinese government.

See also
 Ni Wei-Tou (Ni Weidou) in Taiwan, these two Nis share the same name, the same hometown (Zhenhai District, Ningbo), and the same ancestry. And the Taiwanese Ni graduated from and works for the National Tsing Hua University (in Hsinchu, Taiwan), which is the sister university (share the same root) of the Tsinghua University in Beijing.

References

External links
 Tsinghua Alumni Association: 两岸倪维斗
 Ni Weidou | US-China Green Energy Council
 Energy integration for China | Ni Weidou - China Dialogue

1932 births
Living people
Engineers from Zhejiang
Physicists from Zhejiang
Members of the Chinese Academy of Engineering
Nanyang Model High School alumni
Bauman Moscow State Technical University alumni
Tsinghua University alumni
Academic staff of Tsinghua University
Scientists from Ningbo
Educators from Ningbo